Qom Yek-e Kuchak (also Romanized as Qom Yek-e Kūchak; also known as Qomīk) is a village in Dashtabi-ye Sharqi Rural District, Dashtabi District, Buin Zahra County, Qazvin Province, Iran. At the 2006 census, its population was 120, in 31 families.

References 

Populated places in Buin Zahra County